is a Japanese figure skater. She is the 2023 World Junior bronze medalist, 2022 JGP Poland II champion, 2022 JGP Latvia bronze medalist, and 2022–23 Japan Junior bronze medalist.

Career 
Nakai began skating in 2013.

As the 2018 Japanese national novice B champion, she was invited to skate in the gala at the 2019 World Team Trophy.

2021–22 season 
Nakai placed seventh at the 2021–22 Japan Junior National Championships but was invited to compete at the 2021–22 Japan Senior National Championships because the junior champion Mao Shimada was still a novice skater. She popped her planned triple Axel in the short program and struggled on the landing of the triple Lutz, finishing in twenty-seventh and not advancing to the final.

Nakai was sent to 2022 Coupe du Printemps to compete at the junior category. She won and became the twentieth woman to land a triple Axel in international competition.

2022–23 season 
In September 2022, Nakai debuted on the Junior Grand Prix circuit at the 2022 JGP Latvia in Riga. She landed all her jumps cleanly in her short program and placed third with 63.87 points. Nakai attempted a triple Axel but was marked as under-rotated during the free skate. She popped two jumps and finished third overall. At the second of two Polish Junior Grand Prixes held in Gdańsk, she won the gold medal and qualified to the 2022–23 Junior Grand Prix Final. Nakai landed a clean triple Axel in the free skate and said afterward that she hoped to do two in the free skate at the Final.

Fourth in the short program at the 2022–23 Japan Junior Championships, Nakai landed a triple Axel in the free skate and made only one jumping error, a fall on her triple loop. She placed third in that segment, moving up to take the bronze medal.Two weeks later, at the Junior Grand Prix Final, Nakai finished in fourth place, 1.16 points behind bronze medalist Kim Chae-yeon of South Korea. Despite narrowly missing the podium, she described the Final as "a dream stage."

Nakai appeared at her second senior Japan Championships, finishing eighth in the short program. She finished fourth in the free skate, successfully landing two triple Axel jumps, and rising to fourth place overall. She said she was "happy to have challenged two Axels on this big stage, and landed them both! It's the first time I have been able to land both in the same program." Nakai was assigned to Japan's second berth at the 2023 World Junior Championships, alongside Shimada.

Competing at the World Junior Championships in Calgary, Nakai was third in the short program with a clean skate. With a score of 67.28, she finished 3.96 points back of second-place Shin Ji-a of South Korea, and 3.31 points ahead of Kim Yu-jae in fourth. Nakai fell on her triple Axel attempt at the beginning of the free skate, but delivered the rest of the program cleanly, finishing third in that segment as well and winning the bronze medal.

Programs

Competitive highlights

Detailed results 
JGP: Junior Grand Prix 

Current personal best scores are highlighted in bold.

Senior level

Junior level

References

External links 
 
 NAKAI Ami at the Japan Skating Federation

Japanese female single skaters
Living people
2008 births
Sportspeople from Niigata Prefecture